The 1961 Limerick Senior Hurling Championship was the 67th staging of the Limerick Senior Hurling Championship since its establishment by the Limerick County Board.

Kilmallock were the defending champions.

Western Gaels won the championship after a 7-04 to 0-09 defeat of Treaty Sarsfields in the final. It was their first ever championship title.

References

Limerick Senior Hurling Championship
Limerick Senior Hurling Championship